Radhamés Mora (born 16 February 1948) is a Dominican Republic sprinter. He competed in the men's 4 × 400 metres relay at the 1968 Summer Olympics.

References

1948 births
Living people
Athletes (track and field) at the 1968 Summer Olympics
Dominican Republic male sprinters
Dominican Republic male hurdlers
Olympic athletes of the Dominican Republic
Place of birth missing (living people)